Brian Lawrence Johns (born August 5, 1982) is a former competition swimmer from Canada.  Born in Regina, Saskatchewan, he grew up in Richmond, British Columbia and trained with the Aquanauts and Racers (later Rapids) swim clubs. He started swimming at age five.  He attended the University of British Columbia, where he was a member of the UBC Thunderbirds varsity swimming team.  He held the world record in the 400-metre individual medley (short-course), with a time of 4:02.72.  He won a silver medal at the 2002 world championships in Moscow, Russia in the 400-metre individual medley, and a bronze at the 1999 World Championships in Hong Kong in the 4x200-metre freestyle relay.

He was a member of the Canadian team that finished in fifth place in the 4x200-metre freestyle relay at the 2008 Summer Olympics in Beijing.

Olympic finishes
2000 Sydney – 15th place 200m IM, 7th place 4 × 200 m freestyle relay
2004 Athens – 15th place 400m IM, 5th place 4 × 200 m freestyle relay
2008 Beijing – 7th place in 400 IM, 5th place in 4 × 200 m freestyle relay

See also
 List of Commonwealth Games medallists in swimming (men)
 World record progression 400 metres individual medley

References

1982 births
Living people
Canadian male freestyle swimmers
World record setters in swimming
Medalists at the FINA World Swimming Championships (25 m)
Olympic swimmers of Canada
People from Richmond, British Columbia
Sportspeople from British Columbia
Sportspeople from Regina, Saskatchewan
Swimmers at the 1999 Pan American Games
Swimmers at the 2000 Summer Olympics
Swimmers at the 2004 Summer Olympics
Swimmers at the 2008 Summer Olympics
UBC Thunderbirds swimmers
World Aquatics Championships medalists in swimming
Pan American Games bronze medalists for Canada
Commonwealth Games silver medallists for Canada
Commonwealth Games bronze medallists for Canada
Swimmers at the 2002 Commonwealth Games
Swimmers at the 2006 Commonwealth Games
Commonwealth Games medallists in swimming
Pan American Games medalists in swimming
Universiade medalists in swimming
Universiade gold medalists for Canada
Medalists at the 2007 Summer Universiade
Medalists at the 2009 Summer Universiade
Medalists at the 1999 Pan American Games
Medallists at the 2002 Commonwealth Games
Medallists at the 2006 Commonwealth Games